Cineplexx is an electronic musician from Argentina. He has released eight albums.

Biography 
Sebastian Litmanovich was born March 13, 1973, in Buenos Aires. He is a graphic artist and musician who currently lives in London. His influences run from The Velvet Underground to ABBA.

In 1998, after playing in a few bands, Litmanovich founded Cineplexx. His first release, Posología, appeared through Caipirinha; an experimental electronic label based in NY. It was followed by the self released album Electrocardiograma in 2003, which was re-released by Cherry Red in 2010.

Soon thereafter, Cineplexx began playing shows - in Argentina, New York and Tokyo. He appeared at the Lowlands Festival in the Netherlands and the Sonar Festival in Barcelona. For four years he played around Europe and Asia both as Cineplexx and as part of the audio-visual duo, Cacahuetes Inc. In 2006 Federico Aubele invited him to join his band on a European Tour.

In 2008, Cineplexx recorded Picnic, enlisting the help of friends Duglas Stewart (BMX Bandits), Norman Blake (Teenage Fanclub), Jad Fair and Federico Aubele.

In 2014, he released the album Florianopolis through Nueva Hola Records.

He also made some albums under diverse alias such as Amarena Incident (a post rock band from 1997), Readme & Anthony (a collage electronic band), Portatile Room Mobile (a cover band together with Leumann.net), and Cacahuetes Inc. (a fake documentary producer with aBe) and also have some collaborations with Jad Fair, Daniel Melero, Glaznost, Leumann, Sebastian Kramer, Wevie Stonder, Jaime sin Tierra, Giradioses, jackson souvenirs, aBe (bcn), Lupe Nuñez (of Pipas & Amor de Dias), Cathy Claret, Duglas Stewart (Bmx Bandits) & Norman Blake (Teenage Fanclub).

Discography

Albums
Espejos (2016)
Florianopolis (2014)
Perfume (2012)
Picnic (2008)
Restar (2006)
Electrocardiograma (2003 )
Capacidad Maxima: 1 Persona (2003)
Posología (1999)

Compilation 
Nuevahola (Compilation CD 2010, Cherry Red Records)

Live 
Dublab Session (2007)

EP 
Pequeños Accidentes Domesticos (2003)

References

External links
 Cineplexx aka Sebastian Litmanovich official website
 [ Cineplexx at Allmusic]

1973 births
Living people
Argentine male singer-songwriters
21st-century Argentine  male singers